Daniels Mill may refer to:

Daniels Mill, Shropshire, a watermill near Bridgnorth in the English county of Shropshire
 Daniels Mill (Daniels, Maryland), a place on the List of Registered Historic Places in the US state of Maryland